Cymothoe hartigi, or Hartig's red glider, is a butterfly in the family Nymphalidae. It is found in Guinea, Sierra Leone, Liberia and Ivory Coast. The habitat consists of primary forests.

Subspecies
Cymothoe hartigi hartigi (eastern Guinea, south-eastern Sierra Leone, western Liberia)
Cymothoe hartigi vanessae Warren-Gash, 2003 (south-western Ivory Coast)

References

Butterflies described in 1990
Cymothoe (butterfly)